Henry Denman Thompson (October 15, 1833 – April 14, 1911) was an American playwright and theatre actor.

Biography
Rufus Thompson, a carpenter, and his wife Anne Hathaway Baxter moved in 1831 from West Swanzey, New Hampshire to Girard, Pennsylvania, near Erie, where their son Henry Denman Thompson was born. In 1847, they returned to West Swanzey, where he was educated and at nineteen began work as a bookkeeper in Lowell, Massachusetts. While there, he developed an interest in theatre and decided to make it his career. He first went on the professional stage in 1850 at the Howard Athenæum in Boston, where he played a supernumerary in Macbeth. His first speaking role was in 1852 at Lowell, playing Orasman in the military drama, The French Spy. He moved to Toronto in 1854 to train at the Royal Lyceum Theatre, and in 1860 married Maria Bolton, with whom he had three children. But Thompson had a disregard for serious study or rehearsals, and a manner unsuited for serious drama. With his large, good-natured eyes and thick red hair brushed straight up, audiences might laugh, ruining the gravitas of any scene. So he abandoned tragedy, and by 1862 was in England, performing at the City of London Theatre as a low comedian.

Thompson returned to Toronto that fall, then moved to his native United States in 1868, where he continued to work in theatre. Years later, he was with a vaudeville troupe when he wrote a short sketch about "Joshua Whitcomb," a New Hampshire "hayseed" who travels to the big city. When Thompson performed the routine for the first time in 1875 at Pittsburgh, it was warmly received, and became quite popular during the next few years. In 1885, he rewrote his sketch into a four-act play, entitled The Old Homestead. The new play opened in Boston in April 1886 with Thompson in the lead role, and became a very successful production that made him wealthy, with both a West Swanzey gentleman's farm and nearby lakefront summer cottage.
 
Thompson toured with the play throughout the United States, debuted with it on Broadway in 1904, and returned as a revival in 1907. In 1915, after his death, it was made into a silent film of the same name by the Famous Players Film Company. Thompson wrote other plays, including some collaborative efforts with George W. Ryer (1843–1902), of which several were made into motion pictures. Their 1886 Broadway play became the basis for the 1926 film Sunshine of Paradise Alley, as was the case with their 1903 Broadway production of Our New Minister, which became the basis for the script for the 1913 Kalem Company film starring Alice Joyce and Tom Moore. In 1914, the Kalem Company also made the highly successful adventure film serial, The Hazards of Helen, based on Thompson's work.

Denman Thompson died when aged 77 at his home in West Swanzey. He is featured on a New Hampshire historical marker (number 22) near New Hampshire Route 32 in Swanzey.

References

External links

 
 

1833 births
1911 deaths
19th-century American male actors
American male stage actors
Vaudeville performers
19th-century American dramatists and playwrights
People from Erie County, Pennsylvania
People from Cheshire County, New Hampshire
Writers from New Hampshire
Male actors from New Hampshire
American male dramatists and playwrights
Male actors from Pennsylvania
Writers from Pennsylvania